Medvedev is a rural locality (a khutor) and the administrative center of Medvedevskoye Rural Settlement, Ilovlinsky District, Volgograd Oblast, Russia. The population was 1,255 as of 2010. There are 14 streets.

Geography 
Medvedev is located on the banks of the Tishanka River, 37 km southeast of Ilovlya (the district's administrative centre) by road. Obilny is the nearest rural locality.

References 

Rural localities in Ilovlinsky District